Paramount Petroleum Corporation was headquartered in Paramount, Los Angeles County, California.  It operated a refinery at that location, and was the largest seller of asphalt in California.  

Paramount also operated a refinery near Portland, Oregon, as well as several marketing terminals in the Western United States.

Company
Paramount had been a subsidiary of Alon USA, a publicly traded refining and marketing company (NYSE:ALJ), since 2006.  The president of the company was Alan P Moret. The company was largely financed by two prominent multi billionaires of the United States.

Delek US acquired Alon USA in 2017.

References

Oil companies of the United States
Companies based in Los Angeles County, California
Paramount, California